Afşar is a town in the District of Balâ, Ankara Province, Turkey.

References

Populated places in Ankara Province
Balâ, Ankara
Towns in Turkey